The Muhammad Subuh Foundation (MSF) is a charitable foundation named in honor of Muhammad Subuh Sumohadiwidjojo (called "Bapak"), the founder of Subud. It is a non-profit, tax-exempt body constituted in the Commonwealth of Virginia. Its major functions are to finance the purchase and construction of Subud centers, and to preserve and disseminate the writings and talks of Bapak,
including his definitive book, published in 1952, Susila Budhi Dharma. 

The MSF has assets of about two million USD.

External links
Official site

Subud
Foundations based in the United States